The title of Earl of Inverness (Scottish Gaelic: Iarla Inbhir Nis) was first created in 1718 in the Jacobite Peerage of Scotland, together with the titles Viscount of Innerpaphrie and Lord Cromlix and Erne, by James Francis Edward Stuart ("James III & VIII") for the Honourable John Hay of Cromlix, third son of the 7th Earl of Kinnoull. He was created Duke of Inverness in 1727, but both titles became extinct upon the death of the grantee in 1740.

It was created first in 1801 as a subsidiary title of Prince Augustus Frederick, Duke of Sussex, sixth son of George III, becoming extinct in 1843. Sussex's second wife (whom he married in contravention of the Royal Marriages Act of 1772 making the marriage legally void) was given the title of Duchess of Inverness in her own right, which became extinct upon her death in 1873.

The next creation was for Prince George (later George V), second son of Albert Edward, Prince of Wales (later Edward VII) and grandson of Queen Victoria, as a subsidiary title along with the Dukedom of York. As the Prince became King in 1910, succeeding his father, his titles merged in the crown.

The title was created again in 1920 as a subsidiary title of the Prince Albert (second son of George V), who was also created Duke of York at the same time. The title merged in the crown when Albert succeeded his brother in 1936 to become King George VI.

The title was created a fourth time in 1986 as a subsidiary title for Queen Elizabeth II's second son, Prince Andrew, Duke of York, along with the title of Baron Killyleagh.

In 2019, some residents of Inverness started a campaign to strip him of that title, stating that "it is inappropriate that Prince Andrew is associated with our beautiful city." In 2022, there was a renewed petition to strip him of the title.

Earls of Inverness, first Creation (1801)

| Prince Augustus FrederickHouse of Hanover1801–1843 also: Duke of Sussex and Baron Arklow (1801)
| 
| 27 January 1773Buckingham House, Londonson of King George III and Queen Charlotte
| 4 April 1793 Lady Augusta Murray2 children2 May 1831Lady Cecilia UnderwoodNo children
| 21 April 1843Kensington Palace, Londonaged 70
|-
| colspan=5|Prince Augustus' marriage to Lady Augusta Murray, which produced two children, was invalid under the Royal Marriages Act 1772; accordingly all his titles became extinct on his death.
|-
|}

Earls of Inverness, second Creation (1892)

| Prince GeorgeHouse of Saxe-Coburg and Gotha1892–1910also: Duke of York and Baron Killarney (1892);Prince of Wales (1901), Duke of Cornwall (1337) and Duke of Rothesay (1398)
| 
| 3 June 1865Marlborough Houseson of King Edward VII and Queen Alexandra
| Mary of Teck6 July 18936 children
| 20 January 1936Sandringham House, Sandringhamaged 70
|-
| colspan=5|Prince George succeeded as King George V in 1910 upon his father's death, and his titles merged with the crown.
|-
|}

Earls of Inverness, third Creation (1920)

| George VIHouse of Windsor1920–1936also: Duke of York and Baron Killarney (1920)
| 
| 14 December 1895Sandringham House, Sandringhamson of King George V and Queen Mary
| Elizabeth Bowes-Lyon26 April 19232 children
| 6 February 1952Sandringham House, Sandringhamaged 56
|-
| colspan=5|Prince Albert succeeded as King George VI in 1936 upon his brother's abdication, and his titles merged with the crown.
|-
|}

Earls of Inverness, fourth Creation (1986)

| Prince AndrewHouse of Windsor1986–presentalso: Duke of York and Baron Killyleagh (1986)
| 
| 19 February 1960Buckingham Palaceson of Elizabeth II and Prince Philip, Duke of Edinburgh
| Sarah Ferguson23 July 1986 – 30 May 1996(divorce)2 children
|  now  old
|-
|}

References

Inverness
 
Earldoms in the Peerage of the United Kingdom
Extinct earldoms in the Peerage of the United Kingdom
British and Irish peerages which merged in the Crown
Noble titles created in 1718
Noble titles created in 1801
Noble titles created in 1892
Noble titles created in 1920
Noble titles created in 1986
Extinct earldoms in the Jacobite Peerage
1718 establishments in France